The rose-ringed parakeet (Psittacula krameri), also known as the ring-necked parakeet (and more commonly known as the Indian/Pakistani ringneck parrot), is a medium-sized parrot in the genus Psittacula, of the family Psittacidae. It has disjunct native ranges in Africa and the Indian Subcontinent, and is now introduced into many other parts of the world where feral populations have established themselves and are bred for the exotic pet trade.

One of the few parrot species that have successfully adapted to living in disturbed habitats, it has withstood the onslaught of urbanisation and deforestation. As a popular pet species, escaped birds have colonised a number of cities around the world, including populations in Northern and Western Europe. These parakeets have also proven themselves capable of living in a variety of climates outside their native range, and are able to survive low winter temperatures in Northern Europe. The species is listed as least concern by the International Union for Conservation of Nature (IUCN) because its population appears to be increasing, but its popularity as a pet and unpopularity with farmers have reduced its numbers in some parts of its native range.

Taxonomy 
Four subspecies are recognised, though they differ little:

 African subspecies: 
 African rose-ringed parakeet (P. k. krameri): West Africa in Guinea, Senegal, and southern Mauritania, east to western Uganda and southern Sudan, north to Egypt. Resident along the Nile Valley and certainly in Giza, it is sometimes seen on the northern coast and in Sinai. The African rose-ringed parakeet also started to breed in Israel and Jordan in the 1980s and is considered an invasive species there. 
 Abyssinian rose-ringed parakeet (P. k. parvirostris): northwestern Somalia, west across northern Ethiopia to Sennar state, Sudan
 Asian subspecies:
 The Indian rose-ringed parakeet (P. k. manillensis) originates from the southern Indian subcontinent and has feral and naturalised populations worldwide, in Australia, Great Britain (mainly around London), the United States, and other Western countries. It is often referred to as the Indian ringneck parrot.
 The boreal rose-ringed parakeet (P. k. borealis) is distributed in Bangladesh, Pakistan, northern India and Nepal to central Burma; introduced populations are found worldwide.

The Asian subspecies are both larger than the African subspecies.

The genus name Psittacula is a diminutive of Latin psittacus, "parrot", and the specific krameri commemorates the Austrian naturalist Wilhelm Heinrich Kramer.

In 2019, a genetic study revived the genus Alexandrinus, formerly viewed as a synonym of the current genus Psittacula. Some organisations, including the IUCN, have accepted the new taxonomy.

Description 
The rose-ringed parakeet is sexually dimorphic. The adult male sports a red and black neck ring, and the hen and immature birds of both sexes either show no neck rings, or display shadow-like pale to dark grey neck rings. Both sexes have a distinctive green colour in the wild, and captive bred ringnecks have multiple colour mutations which include turquoise, cinnamon, olive, white, blue, violet, grey and yellow. Rose-ringed parakeets measure on average  in length, including the tail feathers, a large portion of their total length. In the wild, this is a noisy species with an unmistakable squawking call. Captive individuals can be taught to speak. They are a herbivorous and non-migratory species.

Distribution

Since the 19th century, the rose-ringed parakeet has successfully colonised many other countries. It breeds further north than any other parrot species. It has established itself on a large scale in Germany, France, Belgium, the Netherlands, Italy, and especially the UK. See Feral Birds section below.

The analyses show that the risk of parakeet establishment may rise further as a result of decreasing frost days due to global warming, rising urbanization, and rising human populations. Because of the significant separate parakeet imports in Europe, we are capable of investigating the widely held hypothesis of climate matching and human activity at the species level (Strubbe & Matthysen, 2009).

Ecology and behaviour

Diet
In the wild, rose-ringed parakeets usually feed on buds, fruits, vegetables, nuts, berries, and seeds. Wild flocks also fly several miles to forage in farmlands and orchards, causing extensive damage. Feral parakeets will regularly visit gardens and other locations near human habitation, taking food from bird feeders.

In India, they feed on cereal grains, and during winter also on pigeon peas. In Egypt during the spring, they feed on mulberry and in summer they feed on dates and nest inside palm trees and eat from sunflower and corn fields.

In captivity, rose-ringed parakeets will take a large variety of food and can be fed on a number of fruits, vegetables, pellets, seeds, and even small amounts of cooked meat for protein. Oils, salts, chocolate, alcohol, and other preservatives should be avoided.

Reproduction
In northwestern India, Indian rose-ringed parakeets form pairs from September to December. They do not have life mates and often breed with another partner during the following breeding season. During this cold season, they select and defend nest sites, thus avoiding competition for sites with other birds. Feeding on winter pea crops provides the female with nutrients necessary for egg production. From April to June, they care for their young. Fledglings are ready to leave the nest before monsoon.

Seasonal changes in testicular activity, plasma luteinizing hormone (LH), estradiol (E2), testosterone (T), and 5 α-dihydrotestosterone (5 α-DHT) were related to pair bond formation, nest building, nest defense, and parental behavior in free living Indian rose-ringed parakeets in northwest India (Krishnaprasadan et al., 1988). The parakeets are able to reproduce in the winter because it allows them to avoid competing with other birds for nesting places, postpone having young during the monsoon season, and take use of the winter pea harvest, which provides the female with extra nutrients for egg formation. (Krishnaprasadan et al., 1988).

Aviculture

Rose-ringed parakeets are popular as pets and they have a long history in aviculture. The ancient Greeks kept the Indian subspecies P. krameri manillensis, and the ancient Romans kept the African subspecies P. krameri krameri. Colour mutations of the Indian rose-ringed parakeet subspecies have become widely available in recent years. A blue colour morph mutation of the rose-ringed parakeet is also commonly kept in aviculture. Birds that display this mutation have solid light blue feathers instead of green.

Mimicry
Both males and females have the ability to mimic human speech. First, the bird listens to its surroundings, and then it copies the voice of the human speaker. Some people hand-raise rose-ringed parakeet chicks for this purpose. Such parakeets then become quite tame and receptive to learning. They have extremely clear speech and are one of the best talking parrots.

Feral birds

A popular pet, the rose-ringed parakeet has been released in a wide range of cities around the world, giving it an environment with few predators where their preferred diet of seeds, nuts, fruits, and berries is available from suburban gardens and bird feeders. Its adaptations to cold winters in the Himalayan foothills allow it to easily withstand European winter conditions. It has established feral populations in a number of European cities, South Africa and Japan. There are also apparently stable populations in the U.S. (Florida, California and Hawaii) and small self-sustaining populations in Ankara, İzmir, Istanbul (concentrated in parks), Tunis, Tripoli and Tehran (concentrated in the north side of the city). It is also found throughout Lebanon, Israel, Iran, Jordan, the UAE, Bahrain, Qatar, and Oman. A small number of escaped birds are present in Australia.

The European populations became established during the mid-to-late 20th century. There is a burgeoning population of feral parakeets in Great Britain which is centred around suburban London and the Home Counties of South-East England. Parakeet numbers have been highest in the south-west of London, although the population has since spread rapidly, and large flocks of birds can be observed in places such as Crystal Palace Park, Battersea Park, Buckhurst Hill, Richmond Park, Wimbledon Common, Greenwich Park, and Hampstead Heath, as well as Surrey and Berkshire. Feral parakeets have also been observed in Abbey Wood, Bostall Heath, Bostall Woods and Plumstead Common. The winter of 2006 had three separate roosts of about 6000 birds around London. A smaller population occurs around Margate, Broadstairs and Ramsgate, Kent. There is also an established population to the North East of London in Essex at Loughton and Theydon Bois by Epping Forest. Elsewhere in Britain, smaller feral populations have become established from time to time throughout the Midlands, Northern England and even as far north as Edinburgh. It has been suggested that feral parrots could endanger populations of native British birds, and that the rose-ringed parakeet should be culled as a result, although this is not currently recommended by conservation organisations. A major agricultural pest in locations such as India, as of 2011 the rose-ringed parakeet population was growing rapidly, but is generally limited to urban areas in southern England.

A Europe-wide count was held in 2015 and found 85,220 rose-ringed parakeets in 10 European countries.
{| class="wikitable sortable"
|-
! Country !!style="text-align:right"| Number
|-
| Belgium ||style="text-align:right"| 
|-
| France ||style="text-align:right"| 
|-
| Germany ||style="text-align:right"| 
|-
| Greece ||style="text-align:right"| 
|-
| Italy ||style="text-align:right"| 
|-
| Netherlands ||style="text-align:right"| 
|-
| Portugal ||style="text-align:right"| 
|-
| Spain ||style="text-align:right"| 
|-
| Turkey ||style="text-align:right"| 
|-
| UK ||style="text-align:right"| 
|}

In the Netherlands, the feral population in the four largest urban areas (Amsterdam, Rotterdam, Utrecht and The Hague) was estimated at 20,000 birds in 2021, double the number of birds estimated in 2010. There also exists a feral population in Belgium, with as many as 5,000 pairs estimated in Brussels. These originate from an original population that was set free in 1974 by the owner of the Meli Zoo and Attraction Park near the Atomium who wanted to make Brussels more colourful. In Germany, these birds are found along the Rhine in all major urban areas such as Cologne, Düsseldorf (about 800 birds), Bonn, Ludwigshafen, Heidelberg and Speyer, Wiesbaden and Mainz, and Worms. Other populations are found around Paris, Rome—notably in the gardens of the Palatine Hill, the trees of the Trastevere and Janiculum and at Villa Borghese, in the Orto Botanico di Palermo in Palermo, in Genoa, in Barcelona and in Lisbon.

The specimens in these naturalised populations often represent intra-specific hybrids, originally between varying numbers (according to locality) of the subspecies manillensis, borealis, and/or (to a lesser extent) krameri, along with some inter-specific hybrids with naturalised Psittacula eupatria (the Alexandrine parakeet).

Where introduced, rose-ringed parakeets may affect native biodiversity and human economy and wellness.

Rose-ringed parakeets are a direct threat to populations of Europe's largest bat, the greater noctule, as parakeets compete with the bats for nesting sites, and will attack and kill adults before colonising their habitat.

In the United Kingdom and especially within London, parakeets face predation by native birds of prey and owls, including the peregrine falcon (Falco peregrinus), Eurasian hobby (F. subbuteo) and tawny owl (Strix aluco).

There is a breeding population on Madeira Island, Portugal.

There is a feral population of the birds in Japan. In the 1960s many Japanese people became pet owners for the first time and the parakeet was widely imported as a pet. Some escaped or were released and formed populations around the country. By the 1980s groups could be found in Tokyo, Osaka, Nagoya, Niigata and Kyushu. Some groups since died out, but as of 2009 there was a large population residing at the Tokyo Institute of Technology's main campus at Ookayama, along with small groups in Maebashi and Chiba city.

Feral rose-ringed parakeets have sporadically been observed around New Zealand, and are treated as a major potential threat to the country's native bird populations due to their potential to outcompete native parakeet species, and introduce diseases.

Ring Necked Parakeet and Other Animals
In the María Luisa Park in Seville, the population of the common noctule declined sharply when the population of rose-ringed parakeets increased 20-fold. The rose-ringed parakeets attacked the common noctule at tree cavities and occupied most of the cavities previously used by the bats. The attacks by the rose-ringed parakeets often led to the death of the common noctule. In 14 years, the number of tree cavities occupied by the common noctule decreased by 81%. A spatial analysis of tree cavity use showed that the common noctule tried to avoid cavities near parakeets. In the Rhineland, conspicuous bite wounds have been found in bats caught near rose-ringed parakeet nesting cavities. However, more detailed studies in the Rhineland on this are missing so far. Several authors have reported negative behaviors of the ring-necked parakeet near their nest sites: lethal attacks on a Leisler's bat (Nyctalus leisleri) in Italy (Menchetti et al. 2014), on black rats (Rattus rattus) in Spain (Hernández-Brito et al. 2014b) and on several competitor and predator species in Spain (Hernández-Brito et al. 2014a). In the Paris area in France, an attack by a ring-necked parakeet on an adult red squirrel (Sciurus vulgaris) has been reported (Clergeau et al. 2009).

Gallery

References

External links

 Species text—The Atlas of Southern African Birds
 Photos—Oriental Bird Images
 Videos, photos and sounds—Internet Bird Collection

rose-ringed parakeet
Birds of South Asia
Birds of Sub-Saharan Africa
Feral parrots
rose-ringed parakeet
Parrots of Africa
rose-ringed parakeet
Taxobox binomials not recognized by IUCN